The 2013–14 BAI Basket (36th edition), Angola's top tier basketball club competition, ran from November 15, 2013 through May 20, 2014.

Recreativo do Libolo won the championship after finishing the final four with a 10-2 record.

BAI Basket Participants (2013–14 Season)

Regular Season (November 15, 2013 - March 1, 2014)

Regular season standings

Group Stage (March 14 - April 12, 2014)

Group A

Group stage standings (A)

Group B

Group stage standings (B)

5–8th Classification (April 22 - May 22, 2014)

5–8th Classification standings (After 3 rounds)

Final Four (April 24 - May 22, 2014)

Final four standings (After 12 rounds)

See also
BAI Basket
2013 2nd Division Basketball
BAI Basket Past Seasons
Federação Angolana de Basketball

External links
Official Website 
Eurobasket.com League Page

References

Angolan Basketball League seasons
League
Angola